Indian Grave Gap is a valley in Towns County, Georgia.

According to tradition, Indian Grave Gap was named for a Native American Indian's grave which is topped by a cairn.

References

Landforms of Towns County, Georgia
Valleys of Georgia (U.S. state)